The award was first presented in 1965, as an award for the whole of Czechoslovakia (Czechoslovak Footballer of the Year). It was won by Ján Popluhár.

Ján Popluhár Award
Slovak Footballer of the Year an annual title awarded to the best Slovak football player of the year since 1993.

Peter Dubovský Award
Peter Dubovský Award an annual title awarded to the best under-21 Slovak footballer of the year. The honour has been awarded since 2000 together with the Slovak Footballer of the Year award.

Jozef Vengloš Award
This award is recognises manager of the year. This category allows the participation of foreign football managers managing Slovak teams, as well Slovak managers managing foreign teams. It was first awarded in 2010 to the best manager of 2009. It was named after Jozef Vengloš, following his passing in January 2021.

Domestic Player of the Year
This category is awarded to best domestic top-division players - that is Slovak and foreign players playing in the Fortuna Liga. It was first awarded in 2011, for the best domestic player of 2010.

Fan Award
It was first awarded during the 2012 award ceremony, for the fan favourite of 2011. Fans vote online and select one of ten shortlisted nominees for the Ján Popluhár Award.

References

External links
UEFA.com
 https://web.archive.org/web/20120217135342/http://www.profutbal.sk/clanok70867.htm

Footballers in Slovakia
Association football player of the year awards by nationality
Awards established in 1993
1993 establishments in Slovakia
Annual events in Slovakia
Association football player non-biographical articles